The Essendon Football Club, nicknamed The Bombers, is an Australian rules football club in the Australian Football League (AFL). Thought to have formed in 1872, Essendon played their first Victorian Football Association (VFA) game in 1873, before participating in the inaugural season of the Victorian Football League (now AFL) in 1897. Headquartered at the Essendon Recreation Reserve, Windy Hill in the Melbourne suburb of Essendon, the club has won 16 VFL/AFL premierships, which, along with Carlton, is the most of any club.

The club best and fairest award is claimed by some to have been first given in 1897; however, there is no contemporary evidence that it actually existed prior to the late 1920s. Since 1959 or 1960 it has been known as the W. S. Crichton Medal. Dick Reynolds was awarded medal on a record-equaling seven occasions between 1934 and 1943. Reynolds also won the Brownlow Medal a club-record three times, in 1934, 1937 and 1938. The medal is awarded annually to the best and fairest player in the competition, currently on the basis of a 3-2-1 match-by-match voting system used by the match umpires.
 
Former Richmond player Kevin Sheedy coached Essendon for a record 635 games and four premierships in 27 seasons between 1980 and 2007, thus becoming the second-longest serving coach in VFL/AFL history. Full-forward Matthew Lloyd, is the club's leading goal-kicker with 926, ahead of ruckman Simon Madden with 575. Lloyd was Essendon's leading goal-kicker on a record 12 occasions between 1997 and 2009, kicking 100 goals in a season during 2000 and 2001.

Year

Notes

References

Honours
Australian rules football-related lists